"Care of Cell 44" is a single by the Zombies, from their 1968 album Odessey and Oracle. It was featured on Pitchfork Media's  200 Best Songs of the 1960s list, and has since been covered by modern artists including Elliott Smith and Of Montreal.

Content

"Care of Cell 44" tells the story of a person writing to their partner in prison, as they await their release from prison. Rod Argent, the Zombies main songwriter said "It just appealed to me. That twist on a common scenario, I just can't wait for you to come home to me again". Given the subject matter, the music accompanying this is very upbeat and jaunty, and has been described as "the sunniest song ever written about the impending release of a prison inmate."  Arts journalist Matt Kivel described the music as a "sprightly piano jingle."  The melody incorporates multiple key changes.

Recording history

"Care of Cell 44" was recorded under the working title of "Prison Song" in 4 takes on 16 August 1967. The master recording was completed on 17 August 1967 with a take 5 reduction of take 4. Take 1 was a false start and take 2 was a complete take of the backing track. Both of these outtakes were issued as a bonus track on the 30th Anniversary CD edition of Odessey and Oracle in 1998 by Big Beat Records. The song actually had a second working title of "Care Of Cell 69" but the Zombies' American publisher, Al Gallico told them they couldn't call it that.

Reception

At its time of release as the lead single for Odessey and Oracle in 1967, the track was not a success, causing some of the tension that led to the eventual breakup of the band in December of that year. Colin Blunstone, the group's vocalist said, "I thought that 'Care of Cell 44' was incredibly commercial. I was really disappointed when it wasn't a hit."

However, subsequent critical reappraisal of the album, following both the success of "Time of the Season" the following year and the album's later cult following has led to the track becoming much more popular, resulting in several cover versions from modern artists.

AllMusic critic Matthew Greenwald calls it a "breezy, infectious pop melody" with "choral harmony breaks," and particularly praises Chris White's "melodic" bass playing.  He also remarks that the song shows its Brian Wilson and Paul McCartney influences but remains original.  Matt Kivel claims that "in three minutes and fifty three seconds the Zombies have slyly redefined the lyrical conventions of a modern pop song."  Music critic Antonio Mendez called it one of the sublime songs on Odessey and Oracle.

Personnel

Colin Blunstone – lead vocals
Rod Argent – organ, piano, keyboards,  Mellotron, backing vocals
Paul Atkinson – guitar
Chris White – bass, backing vocals
Hugh Grundy – drums, percussion

Production notes
Geoff Emerick – engineer
Peter Vince – engineer

Cover versions

 Elliott Smith performed "Care of Cell 44" in concert.
 Matthew Sweet and Susanna Hoffs covered the song on Under the Covers, Vol. 1.
 Beth Sorrentino covered the song on Hiding Out.
 The Chrysanthemums covered the song on their album Odessey and Oracle.  AllMusic critic Stewart Mason claims that by using tape loops and sound effects in place of the original orchestral parts, the Chrysanthemum's version is able to highlight the lyrical oddness of the song.

In popular culture
It is used as the theme song for the TV broadcast version of Stone Quackers; however on streaming websites such as Hulu, the song is replaced by the song St. Jacques by Lightning Bolt.

It plays in the background during one of Carol’s sleep-deprived dream sequences in Episode 3 / Season 10 of The Walking Dead.

It is alluded to in the Okkervil River song “Plus Ones.”

Was used as the opening song in Season 2, Episode 1 of the Showtime show United States of Tara

References

1967 singles
The Zombies songs
Songs written by Rod Argent
1967 songs
CBS Records singles
Songs about prison